The Center for Limnology (CFL) is a research center within the College of Letters and Science at the University of Wisconsin—Madison. Established by the UW-Madison Board of Regents in July 1982, the mission of the center is to plan, conduct, and facilitate inland water research.

Research facilities
The CFL consists of two main research stations: the Arthur D. Hasler Laboratory for Limnology on the UW-Madison campus (Hasler Lab), and the Trout Lake Station, in Boulder Junction, Wisconsin.

External links
 Center for Limnology
 The History of Limnology at the University of Wisconsin–Madison
 "Breaking New Waters: A Century of Limnology at the University of Wisconsin" - special issue of the Transactions of the Wisconsin Academy of Sciences, Arts, and Letters in celebration of a century of limnological research

 University of Wisconsin–Madison
Limnology